The Trilogy of Desire is a series of three novels by Theodore Dreiser:

The Financier (1912)
The Titan (1914)
The Stoic (1947)

The protagonist of the trilogy, Frank Algernon Cowperwood, was modeled after financier Charles Yerkes. The novels narrate his rise and fall through an unscrupulous, self-centered quest for power and wealth.

Novels by Theodore Dreiser
World Publishing Company books
1972 American novels